Romain Paul Jean-Michel Perraud (born 22 September 1997) is a French professional footballer who plays as a left-back for Premier League club Southampton. He previously played for Nice and Brest.

Club career

Early career
Born in Toulouse in 1997, Perraud began his youth career with local side, Blagnac FC in 2007. He left in 2008 to join his hometown club Toulouse Fontaines Club, before moving on to US Colomiers Football in 2009.

Nice
In 2014, Perraud joined OGC Nice's youth team from US Colomiers Football. Two years later, he joined the club's senior ranks. On 8 December 2016, Perraud made his senior debut for Nice in the 6th matchday of the 2016–17 UEFA Europa League against FC Krasnodar at Allianz Riviera, playing the full match.

Loan to Paris FC 
In August 2018, Perraud signed a season-long loan with Paris FC. On 14 September 2018, he made his first appearance for the club in a 0–0 draw with AC Ajaccio. On 22 September 2018, Perraud scored his first goal for Paris FC after a 2–1 win against FC Metz.

Brest 
On 17 July 2019, Perraud signed a four-year deal with Brest. On 10 August 2019, he made his first appearance for the club in a 1–1 draw against Toulouse. On 13 September 2020, Perraud scored his first goal for Brest in a 2–0 victory over Dijon.

Southampton 
On 2 July 2021, Perraud signed a four-year contract with Southampton for an undisclosed fee. On 14 August 2021, he made his first Premier League appearance for Southampton in a 3–1 defeat to Everton. On 2 March 2022, Perraud scored his first professional goal for Southampton with a 30 yard drive in a 3–1 FA Cup victory against West Ham.

Career statistics

Honours

Individual
Toulon Tournament Best XI: 2018

References

External links

Living people
1997 births
Footballers from Toulouse
French footballers
France youth international footballers
Association football defenders
OGC Nice players
Paris FC players
Stade Brestois 29 players
Southampton F.C. players
Ligue 1 players
Ligue 2 players
Premier League players
French expatriate footballers
Expatriate footballers in England
French expatriate sportspeople in England